Georgi Nikolayevich Vladimov (real family name Volosevich, ; 19 February 1931, Kharkiv – 19 October 2003, Frankfurt) was a Russian dissident writer.

Biography
In 1977 he became the leader of the Moscow section of Amnesty International, forbidden in the USSR. In 1983, he emigrated to West Germany.

Vladimov's most famous novel is Faithful Ruslan, the tale of a guard dog in a Soviet Gulag, told from the dog's perspective. It circulated in the Soviet Union as a samizdat publication, before being published in West Germany in 1975.

His novel The General and His Army, on General Chibisov (Kobrissov) and General Vlasov, was awarded the Russian Booker Prize in 1995 and the Sakharov Prize in 2000.

Works
 The Great Ore (Большая руда, 1961)
 Three Minutes of Silence (Три минуты молчания, 1969)
 Faithful Ruslan (Верный Руслан, 1975)
 The Sixth Soldier, 1981
 Pay No Attention, Maestro (Не обращайте внимания, маэстро, 1983)
 The General and His Army (Генерал и его армия, 1994)

References

External links
 Encyclopædia Britannica article
 

1931 births
2003 deaths
Writers from Kharkiv
Saint Petersburg State University alumni
Russian male novelists
Soviet writers
Soviet dissidents
Russian Booker Prize winners
20th-century novelists
People denaturalized by the Soviet Union
Soviet emigrants to West Germany
Amnesty International people
20th-century Russian male writers